Cake is a 2014 American drama film directed by Daniel Barnz, written by Patrick Tobin, and starring Jennifer Aniston, Adriana Barraza, Felicity Huffman, William H. Macy, Anna Kendrick, and Sam Worthington. It debuted in the Special Presentations section of the 2014 Toronto International Film Festival.

Cake received mixed reviews and was a box-office bomb, grossing $2.9 million against its $7–10 million budget. However, Aniston's dramatic performance received positive reviews and brought her a nomination at the Golden Globe Awards and another at the Screen Actors Guild Awards.

Plot

A year after surviving a car accident that killed her son, former attorney Claire Bennett struggles with chronic pain, making her angry. Silvana, her housekeeper, caretaker and chauffeur, looks after all of her needs. 

Claire abuses pain medication to deal with her son's death and the suicide of Nina, a member of her chronic pain support group. With her marriage and life falling apart, she ends up buying drugs on the street to support her addiction. She also dreams vividly and hallucinates about Nina.

In physical therapy, Claire is uncooperative and risks her medication being cut off, as her condition has not improved. After her session, Claire jumps into the pool with body weights, seemingly to kill herself. She stays on the bottom for a long time before rising to the surface.
 
At the threat of a lawsuit, the support group leader, Annette, gives Claire Nina's home address. Claire goes to the house, and Nina's husband Roy, having been tipped off by Annette, confronts her as she is leaving. Bonding over their loss and isolation, Claire and Roy go to Nina's grave. A few nights later Claire surprises him at home but takes Nina's leftover Percocet. Claire's dreams of Nina continue.

The man responsible for Claire's car accident, Leonard,  shows up at her house to apologize. She physically attacks him. Afterwards, she inadvertently overdoses on the pain medication. Taken to the hospital, she dreams of Nina presenting her with a birthday cake with six lit candles, explaining that she feels guilty about not being able to make a homemade birthday cake for her son.

Claire is discharged from the hospital and struggles to remain drug free.  She asks Silvana to drive her to the drive-in where she had her first date with Jason. Wandering away, she lies down on the nearby railroad tracks and hallucinates a conversation with Nina, who gets Claire to admit she was a good mother. Claire hears Silvana calling her and when she gets up, Nina vanishes. Silvana loudly criticizes Claire for abusing everyone and pushing away Jason, who is also suffering the loss of their son. She is interrupted when Claire notices the car has been stolen, forcing them to stay in a motel.

The next day Becky, a girl on her way to Los Angeles, tries to steal Claire's purse. Claire brings her home to make her a homemade cake. Silvana later wakes Claire when she sees Becky has in fact stolen the purse, but has left a beautiful cake. Claire takes it to Roy for his son's birthday, as a way of thanking Nina. She and Silvana go to visit her son's grave, where Silvana hangs a wind chime in a nearby tree. On the ride home, Claire finally sits upright in the car.

Cast

 Jennifer Aniston as Claire Bennett
 Adriana Barraza as Silvana
 Anna Kendrick as Nina Collins
 Sam Worthington as Roy Collins
 Mamie Gummer as Bonnie
 Felicity Huffman as Annette
 William H. Macy as Leonard
 Chris Messina as Jason Bennett
 Lucy Punch as Nurse Gayle
 Evan O'Toole as Casey Collins
 Britt Robertson as Becky
 Paula Cale as Carol
 Ashley Crow as Stephanie
 Manuel Garcia-Rulfo as Arturo
 Camille Guaty as Tina
 Allen Maldonado as Buddy
 Camille Mana as Nurse Salazar
 Julio Oscar Mechoso as Dr. Mata
 Pepe Serna as Nuncio
 Misty Upham as Liz
 Rose Abdoo as Innocencia
 Alma Martinez as Irma

Production 
On February 10, 2014, it was announced that Jennifer Aniston would play the lead in Cake. Daniel Barnz, the director, said "Of the zillions of Jennifer Aniston fans, I might be the biggest one of all. I've especially loved her more dramatic performances, and I can’t wait to watch her tackle a role that has such a brilliantly funny voice and so much raw pain (hats off to writer Patrick Tobin). I’m honored to be collaborating with Ben, Kristin and Courtney, and it’s exciting that Cake will be the first film under the Cinelou banner. It feels like we’re all taking a leap of faith together, and that’s pretty thrilling." On March 15, Mexican actress Adriana Barraza was also announced in the cast of the drama. The rest of the cast was revealed on April 1.

Principal photography, which took place in Los Angeles, began April 3, 2014 and ended mid-May.

Release
Cake was released in select theatres on December 31, 2014 by Cinelou Films, before going on general release on January 23, 2015 by Freestyle Releasing. The film was released on DVD & Blu-ray April 21, 2015.

Reception
On review aggregator website Rotten Tomatoes, the film holds an approval rating of 49% based on 133 reviews, with an average rating of 5.80/10. The site's critical consensus reads, "Cake finds Jennifer Aniston making the most of an overdue opportunity to test her dramatic chops, but it lacks sufficient depth or warmth to recommend for all but her most ardent fans." On Metacritic, the film has a score of 49 out of 100, based on reviews from 38 critics, indicating "mixed or average reviews".

At the Toronto premiere, the cast received a standing ovation. The performances of Jennifer Aniston and Adriana Barraza have been highly praised by some critics. Pete Hammond of Deadline described Aniston's performance as "heartbreakingly good... There are really no tricks to this performance. It's raw and real, poignant and unexpected." Clayton Davis of Awards Circuit spoke of Aniston's performance as "the single best performance by an actress this year... Aniston's performance is something that most actresses will pray to be able to achieve, but never come close." In his review for HitFix, Gregory Ellwood wrote that "Aniston makes you believe in Claire's pain. She makes you believe this character is at her lowest point and only she can pull herself out of it. There is no Oscar scene. There is no massive crying fit. It's a complete performance from beginning to end and she deserves the appropriate accolades for it." Of Aniston's performance, David Nusair of Reel Film Reviews wrote "...the actress steps into the shoes of her thoroughly damaged character to an often revelatory extent." Sheri Linden of the Los Angeles Times also spoke positively of Aniston's performance, writing "Aniston lends the role an impressively agonized physicality and brings ace timing to the screenplay's welcome gallows humor."

Accolades

References

External links
 
 
 
 

2014 films
2014 drama films
American independent films
American drama films
2010s English-language films
Films about road accidents and incidents
Films about suicide
Films directed by Daniel Barnz
Films produced by Jennifer Aniston
Films scored by Christophe Beck
Cinelou Films films
Echo Films films
Films about depression
Films about grieving
Films set in Los Angeles
Films shot in Los Angeles
2014 independent films
2010s American films
Films about disability